Slovenske elektrarne may refer to:

Slovenské elektrárne, an electric utility company in Slovakia
Holding Slovenske elektrarne, an electric utility company in Slovenia